
Pajaral Lake or Laguna Pajaral is a Bolivian Amazon freshwater lagoon located to the north of the department of Santa Cruz, near it border with the department of Beni.

Geography 
Laguna Pajaral has an area of 9.3 square kilometers and a round shape.  Its elevation is 200 m.

References 

Lakes of Santa Cruz Department (Bolivia)